James Christopher Healey (born 1944) was Dean of Lismore from 1997 until 1999.

After curacies in Boultham and Grimsby he held incumbencies at Narraghmore and New Ross.

References

1944 births
Deans of Lismore
Living people
Place of birth missing (living people)
Date of birth missing (living people)